The mayor of Palermo is an elected politician who, along with the Palermo's city council, is accountable for the strategic government of Palermo in Sicily, Italy. The current mayor is Roberto Lagalla, who took office on 20 June 2022.

Overview

According to the Italian Constitution, the mayor of Palermo is a member of the Palermo city council.

The mayor is elected by the population of Palermo. Citizens elect also the members of the city council, which also controls the mayor's policy guidelines and is able to enforce his resignation by a motion of no confidence. The mayor is entitled to appoint and release the members of his government.

Since 1993 the mayor has been elected directly by Palermo's electorate: in all mayoral elections in Italy in cities with a population higher than 15,000 the voters express a direct choice for the mayor or an indirect choice voting for the party of the candidate's coalition. If no candidate receives at least 50% of votes, the top two candidates go to a second round after two weeks. The election of the city council is based on a direct choice for the candidate with a preference vote: the candidate with the majority of the preferences is elected. The number of the seats for each party is determined proportionally.

Kingdom of Italy (1860–1946)

Mayors
In 1860, the nascent Kingdom of Italy created the office of the mayor of Palermo, chosen by the city council.
1861-1862, Salesio Balsamo
1862-1863, Mariano Stabile
1863-1866, Antonio Starabba, Marchese di Rudinì
1866-1873, Salesio Balsano
1873-1876, Emanuale Notarbartolo
1876-1878, Francesco Paolo Perez
1878-1880, Giovanni Raffaele
1880-1881, Salesio Balsano
1881-1882, Nicolò Turrisi Colonna
1882-1885, Piero Ugo Delle Fave
1885, Salvatore Romano Lo Faso
1885, Fortunato Vergara di Fraco
1885-1886, Giulio Benso Sammartino Duca della Verdura
1886-1887, Nicolò Turrisi Colonna
1887-1890, Giulio Benso Sammartino Duca della Verdura
1890-1892, Emanuele Paternò
1892-1893, Piero Ugo Delle Fave
1893-1895, Eugenio Olivieri
1895-1897, Angelo Pantaleone
1897-1898, Michele Amato Pojero
1898-1900, Eugenio Olivieri
1900, Maria Rebucci
1900-1901, Paolo Beccadelli di Camporeale
1901-1902, Pietro Vayrat
1902-1903, Giuseppe Tasca Lanza
1903-1905, Pietro Buonanno
1905-1906, Girolamo di Martino
1906-1907, Giuseppe Tasca Lanza
1907-1908, Pietro Francesco Tesauro
1908-1909, Gennauro Bladier
1909-1910, Romualdo Trigona di Sant'Elia
1910-1911, Francesco Gay
1911-1912, Girolamo di Martino
1912-1914, Vincenzo di Salvo
1914-1920, Salvatore Tagliavia
1920-1924, Giuseppe Lanza di Scalea
1924-1925, Salvatore Del Sano
1925-1926, Salvatore Di Marzo

Fascist Podestà
The Fascist dictatorship abolished mayors and city councils in 1926, replacing them with an authoritarian Podestà chosen by the National Fascist Party:
1926-1929, Salvatore Di Marzo
1929-1933, Michele Spadafora
1933-1934, prefectural dictator Giuseppe Borrelli
1934-1939, Giuseppe Noto
1939-1943, Giuseppe Sofia
1943-1946, some special commissioners (Allied invasion of Sicily)

Republic of Italy (1946–present)
From 1946 to 1993, the mayor of Palermo was chosen by the city council.

Direct election (since 1993)
Since 1993, under provisions of new local administration law, the mayor of Palermo is chosen by direct election, originally every four, and later every five years.

Notes

See also
 Timeline of Palermo

References

External links

Palermo
 List
Politics of Sicily